The Aviation, Communication and Allied Workers Union (ACAWU) is a trade union in Trinidad and Tobago, most of whose members worked for BWIA West Indies Airways.   
BWIA West Indies Airways ceased operations on the 31 December 2006 and became Caribbean Airlines.

ACAWU has fought for the rights of Aviation workers for many years under the leadership of former Secretary General Peter Farmer.

ACAWU's President General is Nwannia Sorzano after a Biennial National Convention and election held in early 2022.  This was the first Biennial National Convention and Election for over four years and the first in many years to elect a full slate of candidates to fill all positions under the ACAWU Constitution .

Nwannia Sorzano appeared at the May Day Parade representing ACAWU in 2022 and was photographed by the Trinidad and Tobago Newsday 

President General Nwannia Sorzano also spoke in support of the position of ACAWU in relation to recent wage negotiations and prospective nationwide protests in May of 2022 which was aired on the TTT Tv station in Trinidad and Tobago

See also

 List of trade unions

References

Trade unions in Trinidad and Tobago